The Junín red squirrel (Sciurus pyrrhinus) is a species of squirrel from Peru and Ecuador.

Description
The majority of the body is covered in dark red fur, grizzled with black, fading to a chestnut brown on the tail, which is slightly shorter than the combined head and body. The underparts vary in colour between individuals, being white, red, or some shade in between. The whiskers and the edges of the ears are black.

Distribution and biology
The squirrel is known to inhabit the eastern slopes of the Andes in central Peru, from Huánuco in the north to Ayacuchco and Cusco in the south, although it may also live further east, perhaps as far as the Bolivian border, and further north, with one specimen collected in 1920 known from Zamora-Chinchipe Province of Ecuador. Within this region it inhabits both lowland rainforests and higher, montane, forests.

Little is known about the squirrel's biology and behaviour. They are known to be diurnal and arboreal, and are often seen in small groups, suggesting that they are not strongly territorial. Lactating females, presumably nursing young, have been identified in January. They are thought to be relatively numerous, and to tolerate human activity such as logging and hunting better than some other squirrels, but their limited range has led to them being classified as "Vulnerable" by the Peruvian Ministry of the Environment.

References

Sciurus
Mammals of Ecuador
Mammals of Peru
Mammals described in 1898
Taxa named by Oldfield Thomas
Taxonomy articles created by Polbot